Ski jumping at the 2011 Winter Universiade was held at the Kiremitliktepe Ski Jump in Erzurum, Turkey. The four events were scheduled between January 28 - February 3, 2011.

Men

Women

Medals table

References

2011 in ski jumping
Ski jumping
Ski jumping in Turkey
2011